Blonde bombshell may refer to:
Blonde bombshell (stereotype), a stereotype for women with blonde hair
The Blonde Bombshell (album), a 1961 album by Trisha Noble
Harlow: The Blonde Bombshell a 1993 documentary about Jean Harlow hosted by Sharon Stone
The Blonde Bombshell, a 1999 two part mini-series by Robert Bierman, based on the life of actress Diana Dors
Blonde Bombshell (novel), a 2010 novel by Tom Holt
A beer from The Old Cannon Brewery
"Bombshell Blonde", an iTunes special song from the 2012 album The Midsummer Station by Owl City
The finishing move of professional wrestler Chris Candido, a superbomb

People
Jean Harlow (1911–1937), American film actress
Charles Borck (1917–2008), Filipino basketball player
Evelyn Dall (1918–2010), American singer and actress
Shelley Winters (1920–2006), American actress
Merle Keagle (1923–1960), American baseball player
LaVerne Carter (1925–2012), American professional bowler
Mamie Van Doren (born 1931) American actress
Diana Dors (1931–1984), English actress
Jayne Mansfield (1933–1967), American actress
Carl Ditterich (born 1945), Australian footballer
Ahmad Latiff Khamaruddin (born 1979), Singaporean footballer

See also
Bombshell (disambiguation)